The Free Cause Party (Turkish: Hür Dava Partisi, abbreviated as HÜDA PAR) is Sunni Kurdish Islamist political party in Turkey.

History

Roots 
Following the decision to end armed struggle in 2002, activists of the Hizbullah's Menzil group founded an association called "Solidarity with the Oppressed" ( or short Mustazaf Der) in 2003. It also became known as the Movement of the Oppressed (Turkish: Mustazaflar Hareketi). On 18 April 2010 Mustazaf Der organized a mass meeting in Diyarbakır to celebrate the anniversary of the Islamic prophet Muhammad’s birthday (known as Mawlid). The Turkish police estimated that the event was attended by 2 million people. The organizers put the figure at over 2.5 million people.

On 20 April 2010 a court in Diyarbakır ordered the closure of the Association for the Oppressed (Mustazaf-Der) on the grounds that it was “conducting activities on behalf of the terrorist organization Hizbollah.” The decision was confirmed by the Court of Cassation on 11 May 2012.

In late 2012, the Movement of the Oppressed announced its will to found a political party, basically to challenge the hegemony of the left-wing and Kurdish nationalist Peace and Democracy Party. On 17 December 2012, the Free Cause Party (Hür Dava Partisi) was founded. On 9 January 2013 the general headquarters in Ankara was opened.

Societies affiliated with Hüda-Par operate under the umbrella organisation Lovers of Prophet particularly active in Kurdish Mawlid meetings.

Aims of the party
Hüda-Par calls for the constitutional recognition of the Kurds and Kurdish language, mother tongue education, the end to the 10 percent election threshold, and the decentralization of state power and strengthening of local administration. The party also advocates for restrictions on the freedom of religion and worship to be lifted, the headscarf ban ended, wants adultery criminalized, and religious marriages to be recognized. Moreover, the party demands that the Turkish state apologizes to Kurds and reinstate the original names of Kurdish-populated places. The party has largely been silent on the question of Kurdish autonomy or independence from Turkey. The party is additionally opposed to LGBT rights.

Elections
The party supported Erdoğan in the 2018 presidential elections and will be supporting him again in 2023. Since their creation in 2012, Hüda-Par has contested the two parliamentary elections of June 2015 and 2018, while chose not to run for the November 2015 elections.

Election results

Provincial results (2015 and 2018)

References

2012 establishments in Turkey
Far-right political parties in Turkey
Islamic political parties in Turkey
Kurdish Islamic organisations
Kurdish Islamism
Kurdish political parties in Turkey
Political parties established in 2012
Political parties in Turkey
Sunni Islamic political parties